William Pacheco (born 18 April 1962) is a Venezuelan footballer. He played in twelve matches for the Venezuela national football team from 1989 to 1991. He was also part of Venezuela's squad for the 1989 Copa América tournament.

References

External links
 

1962 births
Living people
Venezuelan footballers
Venezuela international footballers
Place of birth missing (living people)
Association football defenders
Trujillanos FC managers